Młynisko  is a village in the administrative district of Gmina Strachówka, within Wołomin County, Masovian Voivodeship, in east-central Poland. It was visited by Lech Walesa in 1990 to honor its role in supporting trade unions.

See also
Młynisko, Greater Poland Voivodeship (west-central Poland)
Młynisko, Łódź Voivodeship (central Poland)
Młynisko, Pomeranian Voivodeship (north Poland)

References

Villages in Wołomin County